The 1982 DFB-Pokal Final decided the winner of the 1981–82 DFB-Pokal, the 39th season of Germany's knockout football cup competition. It was played on 1 May 1982 at the Waldstadion in Frankfurt. Bayern Munich won the match 4–2 against 1. FC Nürnberg, to claim their 6th cup title.

The Austrian Reinhold Hintermaier opened the scoring for underdogs Nürnberg after 30 minutes with a shot from about 40 meters away, before Werner Dreßel doubled Der Clubs lead just prior to halftime. However, Bayern stormed back from the halftime deficit. Karl-Heinz Rummenigge got a goal back for Die Roten in the 54th minute, before Wolfgang Kraus scored the equalising goal in the 65th minute. Seven minutes later, Paul Breitner put Bayern ahead from the penalty spot, before Dieter Hoeneß sealed the victory for Bayern in the 89th minute.

The match is remembered for Bayern centre-forward Dieter Hoeneß, who had been injured during the match following a collision with Alois Reinhardt, resulting in a laceration to the forehead. Despite the injury, Hoeneß was persuaded to continue the match for the final hour while wearing a blood-soaked head bandage. He assisted Bayern's first goal, was responsible for the pass to Wolfgang Kraus off which Bayern won a penalty that was subsequently converted for the lead, and scored the last himself in the final minutes to seal the cup victory for Bayern. All three of the goals which Hoeneß played a role in involved him heading the ball. After the match, Hoeneß stated, "This is the most important victory of my career!" He later added, "I did not feel it, I just wanted to win the Pott!" Bayern president Willi O. Hoffmann said, "For this effort, Dieter deserves the Iron Cross."

Route to the final
The DFB-Pokal began with 128 teams in a single-elimination knockout cup competition. There were a total of six rounds leading up to the final. Teams were drawn against each other, and the winner after 90 minutes would advance. If still tied, 30 minutes of extra time was played. If the score was still level, a replay would take place at the original away team's stadium. If still level after 90 minutes, 30 minutes of extra time was played. If the score was still level, a penalty shoot-out was used to determine the winner.

Note: In all results below, the score of the finalist is given first (H: home; A: away).

Match

Details

References

External links
 Match report at kicker.de 
 Match report at WorldFootball.net
 Match report at Fussballdaten.de 

FC Bayern Munich matches
1. FC Nürnberg matches
1981–82 in German football cups
1982
Football in Frankfurt
Sports competitions in Frankfurt
May 1982 sports events in Europe
1980s in Frankfurt